AS Meraker Brug is a company which owns  of wilderness and forest estate, mostly in Meråker, Norway. Activities include forestry, cabin rental, hunting and fishing. The company used to be owned by the  Astrup family, who live in the Oslo area. But in 2022 the Norwegian Government bought the company for 2.65 billion NOK, and is now owned by Statskog. 

Commercial activities in Meråker started the first centuries BCE, with iron mining and later charcoal and tar. Later copper mines and sawmills were established. The estate eventually became known as Selbo Kobberverk ("Selbo Copper Works"), which was bought by Hans Rasmus Astrup, which changed name to Meraker Brug. After Astrup's death in 1898, the estate was sold and was incorporated in 1906, and by then consisted of Mostadmarken gods, Hommelvik Bruk, the Port of Muruvik, Tangen Sagbruk, a sawmill in Stjørdal, Nustad Tresliperi, a sawmill, the carbide plant in Meråker (later Elkem Meraker), the copper mines and a limestone quarry in Meråker, as well as the hunting, fishing, waterfall and forestry rights on the real estate. It was bought by Thomas Fearnley, who incorporated the company after merging in the estates Forbygdgodset and Mostadmarka.

References

Real estate companies of Norway
Companies based in Trøndelag
Real estate companies established in 1906
1906 establishments in Norway
Meråker
Norwegian landowners
Norwegian companies established in 1906